The Arizona Wildcats men's golf team has a strong golf tradition, dating back to their first season in 1934. Since then they have won one national title in 1992.

Wildcats who have won the U.S. Amateur include Eric Meeks and Ricky Barnes.  Besides Majors-winner Jim Furyk, a number of other former Wildcat players have gone on to win on the PGA Tour, including: Don Pooley, Dan Pohl, Robert Gamez, Mike Springer, Rory Sabbatini, Ted Purdy and Nate Lashley.  Furyk is also a Champions Tour major winner, and the eighth player to win both the U.S. Open and U.S. Senior Open.  In addition Wildcat Rory Sabbatini won a Silver Medal at the 2020 Summer Olympics competing for Slovakia.

Yearly Record
Source

Team Tournament Wins (79)
Source:

1938 – Border Conference Championship
1940 – Border Conference Championship
1941 – Border Conference Championship
1942 – Border Conference Championship
1946 – Border Conference Championship
1947 – Border Conference Championship
1948 – Border Conference Championship
1954 – Border Conference Championship
1960 – Border Conference Championship
1969 – All- America Intercollegiate Two-Ball Invitational
1979 – United States Collegiate Two-Ball Championship 
1981 – All- America Intercollegiate Two-Ball Invitational
1981 – Mesa McDonald’s Invitational
1981 – Central Arizona Invitational
1982 – Arizona Collegiate
1982 – Pima Invitational
1984 – USIU Classic
1984 – University of Pacific Invitational
1986 – McDonald’s Rebel Classic
1987 – William H. Tucker Intercollegiate

1987 – Fresno Pepsi Classic
1987 – Western New Mexico Invitational
1987 –  ASU Thunderbird Intercollegiate
1987 – All- America Intercollegiate Two-Ball Invitational
1987 – Pac-10 Conference Championship
1988 – PING-Arizona Intercollegiate
1988 – Taylor Made Miami-Doral Intercollegiate
1988 – United States Intercollegiate
1989 – UCF Budget Classic
1989 – NCAA West Regional Championship
1990 – William H. Tucker Intercollegiate
1991 – William H. Tucker Intercollegiate
1991 – PING-International Intercollegiate
1991 – UCF Budget Classic
1991 – Rolex/Golf Digest Invitational
1991 – Fresno Lexus Classic
1991 – United States Intercollegiate
1991 – Pac-10 Conference Championship
1991 – NCAA West Regional Championship
1992 – John Burns Intercollegiate

1992 – United States Intercollegiate
1992 – Golf Word/Palmetto Dunes Intercollegiate
1992 – Perry Maxwell Intercollegiat
1992 –  NCAA West Regional Championship
1992 – NCAA National Championship
1993 – Golf Digest Invitational
1993 – ASU Thunderbird Intercollegiate
1993 – NCAA West Regional Championship
1996 – PING-Arizona Intercollegiate
1996 – Rolex Match Play Championship
1997 – Missouri Bluffs Invitational
1997 – Taylor Made Red River Classic
2000 – Louisiana Classic
2000 – NCAA West Regional Championship
2001 – CGF Match Play Championships
2001 – United States Intercollegiate
2003 – PING-Arizona Intercollegiate
2003 – John Burns Intercollegiate
2003 – Oregon Duck Invitational
2003 – Arizona NIT

2004 – William H. Tucker Intercollegiate
2004 – PING-Arizona Intercollegiate
2004 – John Burns Intercollegiate
2004 – Hall of Fame Invitational
2004 – Pac-10 Conference Championship
2006 – ASU Thunderbird Invitational
2006 – NCAA West Regional Championship
2007 – Nevada Wolf Pack Classic
2010 – Braveheart Classic
2011 – Anteater Invitational
2012 – Arizona Intercollegiate
2018 – Arizona Intercollegiate
2019 – Arizona Intercollegiate
2020 – Arizona Intercollegiate
2021 – Arizona Intercollegiate
2021 – The Prestige
2021 – Pac-12 Championships
2022 – Arizona Intercollegiate
2022 – NCAA Bryan Regional

Individual Champions
Source:

Regional

Conference
Arizona has had 10 separate golfers win a conference title on 11 separate occasions.

National Honors
Source

NCAA Coach of the Year
1992 – Rick LaRose

Pac-10/12 Coach of the Year
1989 – Rick LaRose
1991 – Rick LaRose
2004 – Rick LaRose
2021 – Jim Anderson

US Amateur Champions
1988 – Eric Meeks
2002 – Ricky Barnes

Walker Cup Selections
1989 – Robert Gamez
1989 – Eric Meeks
1991 – David Berganio Jr.
1993 – David Berganio Jr.
1997 – Jason Gore
2001 – Chris Nallen

Fred Haskins Award
1989 – Robert Gamez

Jack Nicklaus Award
1989 – Robert Gamez

Ben Hogan Award
2000 – Ricky Barnes

National Freshman of the Year
2000 – Ricky Barnes

COSIDA Academic All-American
1991 – Trev Anderson (2nd Team)
2021 – David Laskin (3rd Team)

All-American (Selected by GCAA)
1967 – Drue Johnson (3rd Team)
1969 – Drue Johnson (1st Team)
1976 – Dan Pohl (1st Team)
1987 – Larry Silveira (1st Team)
1987 – Mike Springer (2nd Team)
1988 – Larry Silveira (1st Team)
1988 – Mike Springer (2nd Team)
1988 – Robert Gamez (3rd Team)
1988 – Eric Meeks (3rd Team) 
1989 – Robert Gamez (3rd Team)
1991 – Christian Pena (1st Team)
1991 – David Berganio Jr. (3rd Team) 
1992 – Harry Rudolph (1st Team)
1992 – Manny Zerman (1st Team) 
1992 – David Berganio (3rd Team) 
1993 – David Berganio (1st Team)
1993 – Manny Zerman (1st Team)
1994 – David Howser (3rd Team) 
1995 – Ted Purdy (3rd Team) 
1997 – Rory Sabbatini (1st Team)
1998 – Rory Sabbatini (1st Team)
1999 – Derek Gillespie (2nd Team)
2000 – Ricky Barnes (2nd Team)
2000 – Derek Gillespie (3rd Team) 
2001 – Ricky Barnes (2nd Team)
2001 – Chris Nallen (3rd Team)
2003 – Ricky Barnes (1st Team)
2003 – Chris Nallen (1st Team)
2004 – Chris Nallen (1st Team)
2018 – George Cunningham (2nd Team)
2020 – Trevor Werbylo (3rd Team)
2021 – Brad Reeves (2nd Team)

Freshman All-American (Selected by GCAA)
2000 – Ricky Barnes
2001 – Chris Nallen
2004 – Henry Liaw

Pac-10/12 Player of the Year
1988 – Larry Silveira
1989 – Robert Gamez
1993 – David Berganio 
1998 – Rory Sabbatini
2001 – Ricky Barnes (Co-Player)
2003 – Ricky Barnes
2021 – Brad Reeves

Pac-10/12 Freshman of the Year
2000 – Ricky Barnes
2004 – Henry Liaw

Team Scoring Records
Source:

Individual Scoring Record

Wildcats in the Pros

Source: Arizona 2021-22 Golf Media Guide

References

College golf teams in the United States
University of Arizona